Barrmill railway station was a railway station serving the village of Barrmill, North Ayrshire, Scotland. The station was originally part of the Glasgow, Barrhead and Kilmarnock Joint Railway.

History 
The station opened on 26 June 1873, and closed permanently to passengers on 5 November 1962. Freight services continued on the line until 1964.
Today the line to Barrmill (now singled) is still in existence until just before the site of the station, where it then heads south along the original route of the Lanarkshire and Ayrshire Railway until it reaches DM Beith.

The station site has been redeveloped into a housing estate.  After the regular service on the line to Ardrossan ceased buses ran from the station to Saltcoats.

Gallery

References 
Notes

Sources
 
 Reid, Donald L. (2010). Beith, Barrmill & Gateside. Precious memories. .
 

Disused railway stations in North Ayrshire
Railway stations in Great Britain opened in 1873
Railway stations in Great Britain closed in 1962
Former Glasgow, Barrhead and Kilmarnock Joint Railway stations